The 1973 Campeonato Paulista da Divisão Especial de Futebol Profissional, organized by the Federação Paulista de Futebol, was the 72nd season of São Paulo's top professional football league. Portuguesa and Santos split the title, with the former winning it for the 3rd time and the latter for the 13th. no teams were relegated and the top scorer was Santos' Pelé with 11 goals.

Championship
Much like in the previous year, a preliminary phase was disputed before the championship proper, in which all teams played against each other twice and the six best teams qualified into the main championship. That phase was to be disputed in the second semester of 1972, by the teams that had been eliminated in that phase in the previous year and the six worst-placed teams in the main championship

The championship proper was divided into two rounds, in which each team played against each other once, and the winner of each round qualified to the Finals.

Preliminary round

League table

Results

First round

League table

Results

Second round

League table

Results

Finals
The finals would be disputed in an only match, with extra time in case of a tie, and penalties if the tie persisted. However, after Portuguesa's third shot, when Santos led by 2–0, referee Armando Marques mistakenly sounded the whistle, even though there were still two shots left for each team, and there was still the possibility of Portuguesa tying. When the referee realized his mistake, Portuguesa's players had already left the stadium, and in the very same night, the Federation proclaimed both clubs to have won the title.

Top Scores

References

Campeonato Paulista seasons
Paulista